Sapareva Banya (transliterated Sapareva banya) is a town in southwestern Bulgaria, part of Kyustendil Province. As Ancient Germania (in Dacia), a former bishopric, it is a Latin Catholic titular see.

It is located at the north foot of the Rila mountain 15 km east of Dupnitsa. The town is known for its hot mineral and clear mountain water, as well as the geyser in the town centre that sprang forth in 1957.

History 
The former Roman town of Germania (in Dacia) or Germane once stood at the location of modern Sapareva Banya and in the 3rd century was an important town in Dacia province. This, or possibly Germen, was the birthplace of the great Byzantine general Belisarius and was mentioned in the 6th century as Γερμανία, Γερμανός, Γέρμεννε. In an 11th-century charter of Byzantine Emperor Basil II (Porphyrogenitus/ the Young), it was listed as Γερμάνεια (Germaneia).

Ecclesiastical history 
Germania in Dacia was important enough in the late Roman province of Dacia Mediterranea to become a suffragan bishopric of the Metropolitan Archdiocese of Sardica in the provincial capital (now Sofia), in the sway of the Patriarchate of Constantinople, but the see faded (due to the Huns?). No historical resident Bishop of Germania is recorded.

Titular see 
The diocese was nominally restored in 1933 as Latin Titular bishopric of Germania in Dacia (Latin) / Germania di Dacia (Curiate Italian) / Germanien(sis) in Dacia (Latin adjective).

It is vacant since decades, having had only the following incumbents, so far of the fitting Episcopal (lowest) rank :
 Octavio Betancourt Arango (1970.11.23 – 1975.11.10) as Auxiliary Bishop of Archdiocese of Medellin (Colombia) (1970.11.23 – 1975.11.10); later Bishop of Garzón (Colombia) (1975.11.10 – retired 1977.04.26)
 Dante Carlos Sandrelli (born Italy) (1976.01.02 – 1978.03.31) as Auxiliary Bishop of Diocese of Formosa (Argentina) (1976.01.02 – 1978.03.31); later succeeded as Bishop of Formosa (1978.03.31 – retired 1998.01.14).

Municipality 

Sapareva Banya is also the seat of Sapareva Banya municipality (part of Kyustendil Province), which includes the following 3 villages:
 Ovchartsi
 Resilovo
 Saparevo

Religion 
According to the latest Bulgarian census of 2011, the religious composition, among those who answered the optional question on religious identification, was the following:

Modern names and eponymy 
 Saparevo's modern name, first attested in 1570, is probably derived from the noun tsapar ("woodchopper"), from the dialectal verb tsaparim (цапарим), "to chop, to cut". Some authors suggest an etymology from the Thracian *Sapara.
 The modern name first appears as Bane in 1576. Later on, it was disambiguated by adding the name of the nearby village of Saparevo: the area is rich in mineral springs and many localities have similar names.
 Saparevo Glacier on Smith Island, South Shetland Islands (Atlantic near the Antarctic) is named after Saparevo.

Sights 

The 12th-13th-century St Nicholas Church, the 18th-century St George's Church from the Bulgarian National Revival and the Forty Martyrs Church from 1859 are located in Sapareva Banya.

Balneotherapy 
Mineral water of Separeva banya was highly regarded and used as a cure by Thracians and Romans. Saparevian mineral water is clear, colorless, with smell of hydrogen sulfide, hyperthermal (temperature 103 °C), hydrocarbonate, sulphate-sodium, fluorine, silicon and sulphide. Hydrogen sulfide is 15,5 mg / L. It is claimed that the water treats disorders of the musculoskeletal system, nervous system, and upper respiratory tract, and metal poisoning.

Notable locals 
 Flavius Belisarius, the famous Roman general, was born in Germania, the Roman precursor of Sapareva Banya.

See also 
 List of Catholic dioceses in Bulgaria

References

Sources and external links 

 www.saparevabanya.bg, official municipality website
 GCatholic titular see Germania in Dacia
 Sapareva.hit.bg

Balneotherapy
Towns in Bulgaria
Populated places in Kyustendil Province
Spa towns in Bulgaria
Dacia Mediterranea